Baron Newall, of Clifton-upon-Dunsmoor in the County of Warwick, is a title in the Peerage of the United Kingdom. It was created on 18 July 1946 for Marshal of the Royal Air Force Sir Cyril Newall. He was Chief of the Air Staff between 1937 and 1940 and Governor-General of New Zealand between 1941 and 1946.  the title is held by his only son, the second Baron, who succeeded in 1963.

Barons Newall (1946)
Cyril Louis Norton Newall, 1st Baron Newall (1886–1963)
Francis Storer Eaton Newall, 2nd Baron Newall (b. 1930)

The heir apparent is the present holder's eldest son the Hon. Richard Hugh Eaton Newall (b. 1961).
The heir apparent's heir, and the next heir-in-line to the peerage, is his son William Sam Eaton Newall (b. 2011)

Arms

Notes

References 
Kidd, Charles, Williamson, David (editors). Debrett's Peerage and Baronetage (1990 edition). New York: St Martin's Press, 1990, 

Baronies in the Peerage of the United Kingdom
Noble titles created in 1946